Air chief marshal Sir Walter Graemes Cheshire,  (21 March 1907 – 10 December 1978) was a senior Royal Air Force intelligence officer during World War II, and a senior commander in the 1950s and early 1960s.

RAF career
Educated at Downing College, Cambridge, Cheshire joined the Royal Air Force in 1926. He served in World War II as Chief Intelligence Officer at Headquarters RAF Bomber Command, as Air Attache in Moscow and as Chief Air Intelligence Officer at Headquarters Air Command South East Asia, before becoming Air Officer Commanding AHQ Indo China in October 1945.

Cheshire provided a short report on his time in French Indo-China, which refers to him commanding non-combat elements of the Japanese Air Force when the Air Officer Commanding in Saigon, Indo-china, for a 1979 SOAS London PhD thesis by Peter Dunn. In 2021 Stuart Hadaway, RAF Historical Branch, gave an illustrated talk on 'Britain's Vietnam War: The RAF Over Indo-China 1945-1946' and this includes Cheshire's role.

After the war Cheshire was made Air Officer Commanding RAF Gibraltar and then Commandant of the RAF Staff College, Andover. He went on to be Air Officer Administration at Headquarters Second Tactical Air Force in 1953, Air Officer Commanding No. 13 Group in 1955 and RAF Instructor at the Imperial Defence College in 1957. Promoted to air marshal, his last roles were as Air Officer Commanding RAF Malta in 1959 and Air Member for Personnel in 1961 before retiring as an air chief marshal in 1965.

References

External links 

 Memoir by Air Chief Marshall Sir Walter Cheshire (1907-1978) of Allied disarmament mission in Saigon

1907 births
1978 deaths
Alumni of Downing College, Cambridge
Knights Commander of the Order of the Bath
Knights Grand Cross of the Order of the British Empire
Royal Air Force air marshals
Royal Air Force personnel of World War II